P'iqi Q'ara (Aymara p'iqi, p'iq'iña, phiq'i, phiq'iña head, q'ara bald, bare, "bald-headed", also spelled Pekhe Khara) is a   mountain in the Andes of Bolivia. It is located in the La Paz Department, Nor Yungas Province, on the border of the municipalities of Coripata and Coroico.

References 

Mountains of La Paz Department (Bolivia)